Cannella Media, LLC, formerly Cannella Response Television LLC is a media company based in Burlington, Wisconsin, United States. It is the largest creator of long-form direct television. Rob Medved is the incumbent chief executive officer of the company.

Cannella is known for hit videos such as Tae Bo exercise videos in the 1990s.

History 
Cannella Media was founded by Frank Cannella in 1985. He received Bravo! Entrepreneur Award in 2006 for his contributions to the media industry.

In 2005, Cannella acquired a Los Angeles-based firm which specializes in buying airtime.

In June 2009, Cannella received an investmenet from private equity firms ZM Capital and Palladium Equity Partners.

In May 2011, Cannella moved to the new headquarters in Burlington.

In January 2016, Cannella acquired Media Properties Holdings and was renamed Cannella Media, LLC.

Operations
Cannella Media is buyer of television airtime for direct-to-consumer marketing, or telemarketing.  It coordinates the buying of airtime for clients, and has even created their own OTA television "networks" that serve as another outlet for sales.  The "networks" exist on digital sub-channels, especially with Innovate Corp. stations (HC2 and DTV Americas).  Media Properties already had the REVShare network of sub-channels, and has since created Timeless TV and Magnificent Movies Network.  

Timeless TV broadcasts classic TV programming, as well as infomercials on a network of low-power television stations' sub-channels.  Magnificent Movies Network broadcasts old or classic movies in addition to the infomercials.

References

External Links
Cannella Media website
Magnificent Movies Network
Timeless TV

Companies established in 1985
Mass media companies established in 1985
Telecommunications companies established in 1985
Television broadcasting companies of the United States